Hunter Jumper (born February 28, 1989) is an American soccer player who plays as a defender for National Premier Soccer League club Georgia Storm.

College career
Jumper played his collegiate career at Virginia. During his four years with the Cavaliers, he was named to the Atlantic Coast Conference All-Tournament team three times.

Professional career

Chicago Fire
Jumper was selected with the 28th pick of the 2012 MLS SuperDraft by Chicago Fire. After taking part in preseason, he officially signed for the club on March 6. Jumper made his club and professional debut on March 17, coming on as a 68th-minute substitution in a 1–1 draw against Montreal Impact. His lone professional goal came on August 23, 2013, helping the fire defeat Sporting Kansas City by a 1–0 scoreline.

At the beginning of the 2014 season, Jumper was diagnosed with arrhythmogenic right ventricular dysplasia. After undergoing treatment at the Cedars-Sinai Medical Center and Johns Hopkins Hospital, he was denied medical clearance to play sports and was forced to retire as a professional player. The Fire officially declined his contract option on November 18, ending his time with the club after eight appearances and one goal in all competitions.

Retirement and comeback
Following his retirement, Jumper returned to the University of Virginia to complete his bachelor's degree, "went into finance, got a master’s degree, and started writing for a sports analytics company.” He stayed active in soccer, spending the 2014 collegiate season as a graduate assistant coach at Virginia and criticizing the coaches, owner, and club culture of the Fire on Twitter. In 2020, Jumper received medical clearance to begin playing soccer again. He made his return to the sport on January 4, 2021, signing for National Premier Soccer League expansion club Georgia Storm after going through the club's tryout process. He became the first senior-level signing in club history.

International career
Jumper made one appearance for the United States under-18 national team.

References

External links

 
 
 
 

1989 births
Living people
American soccer players
Soccer players from Texas
Sportspeople from Plano, Texas
Association football defenders
Virginia Cavaliers men's soccer players
Chicago Fire FC draft picks
Chicago Fire FC players
Major League Soccer players
United States men's youth international soccer players